The 8th BRDC International Trophy was a motor race, run to Formula One rules, held on 5 May 1956 at Silverstone Circuit, Northamptonshire. The race was run over 60 laps, and was won by a lap by British driver Stirling Moss in a Vanwall. Moss also took pole, and shared fastest lap with BRM driver Mike Hawthorn.

Results

References 

BRDC International Trophy
BRDC International Trophy
BRDC